"Thinking Out Loud" is a 2014 single by Ed Sheeran.

Thinking out Loud may also refer to:

Books and lectures
Thinking Out Loud, a 1994 book by Anna Quindlen
Thinking Out Loud, a 1998 book by Stephen Joel Trachtenberg
“Thinking Out Loud” Lectures, by Bonnie Honig, 2013

Film and broadcasting
 Buckminster Fuller: Thinking Out Loud, a 1996 TV documentary
 Thinking Out Loud, a 1991 documentary featuring ceramic artist Betty Woodman
 Thinking Out Loud, an episode of BBC anthology TV series Inside No. 9

Radio shows
 WJCW, Thinking Out Loud local morning show with hosts Tim Cable and Carl Swann
 WUML, Thinking Out Loud, a daytime show focusing on current local and world issues
 KBIA, Thinking Out Loud with Darren Hellwege

Racing
Thinking Out Loud, horse, 2012 winner of the North America Cup

Music

Albums
 Thinking Out Loud (Bonnie Pink album), 2007
 Thinking Out Loud (Frank Gambale album), 1995
 Thinkin Out Loud (Kristinia DeBarge album), 2016
 Thinking Out Loud (Young Dolph album)
 Thinking Out Loud, a 2007 album by Pamelia Kurstin

Songs
 "Thinking Out Loud", a 1934 song from the musical Calling All Stars
 "Thinkin' Out Loud", a 1971 song by The Band from the album Cahoots
 "Thinking Out Loud", a 1997 song by Ron Sexsmith from the album Other Songs
 "Thinkin' Out Loud", a 2001 song by Fu Manchu from the album California Crossing
 "Thinking Out Loud", a 2005 song by Emiliana Torrini from the album Fisherman's Woman
 "Thinkin Out Loud", a 2015 song by JoJo from the album LoveJo2

See also
 Benefits of Thinking Out Loud, a 2001 album by A Wilhelm Scream
 Thinking Allowed (disambiguation)